The 2022–23 Superliga is the 67th season of the Polish Superliga, the top men's handball league in Poland. A total of fourteen teams contest this season's league, which began on 2 September 2022 and will conclude on 21 May 2023.

Format
The competition format for the 2022–23 season consists of 14 teams each playing a total of 26 matches, half at home and half away, with the first placed team in the standings earning the Polish Championship. The last placed team is directly relegated to the 1st league, and the penultimate team play relegation playoffs with the willing team from the Central League.

The winners are entitled to play in the EHF Champions League the following season. The 2nd, 3rd and 4th team in the standings gain a chance to take part in the upcoming EHF European League edition.

League table
Results

Relegation round

Playoffs

|}

References

External links
 Official website 

2022–23 domestic handball leagues
Superliga
Superliga
Superliga
Superliga
Poland